Duane Caryl Spriestersbach (September 5, 1916 – April 25, 2011) was an acting President of the University of Iowa, serving from 1981 to 1982.

Academic career 
Spriesterbach graduated from Winona State University in 1939, and received his MA in 1940 and his Ph.D. in 1948 from the University of Iowa (UI). From 1948 to 1989 he was Professor of Speech Pathology and Audiology at UI. He specialized in the area of cleft lip and palates. He wrote many articles and books on the subject. Spriesterbach served as dean of the UI Graduate College from 1965 to 1989 and served both as vice president for research and as vice president for educational research and development, before serving as the acting president.

UI's most distinguished dissertation prize, the D.C. Spriestersbach Dissertation Prize, is named in his honor. He was known for being able to tackle any problem assigned to him and for being a friend to students. He helped transform research by creating "centers" that organized research across department and college lines.

Private life 
Nicknamed "Sprie", Duane Caryl Spriestersbach was born on September 5, 1916, in Pine Island, MN, the son of Esther (née Stucky) and Merle Spriestersbach. He had two sisters, Beverly and Gretchen. He married Bette Rae Bartelt in  1946 and they had a son and a daughter. During World War II Spriestersbach was in the 13th Armored Division and was awarded a Bronze Star. He stayed in the United States Army Reserve after the war retiring as a lieutenant colonel.

Spriestersbach died on April 25, 2011, at Mercy Hospital in Iowa City.

References

External links 
 

Presidents of the University of Iowa
1916 births
2011 deaths
People from Iowa City, Iowa
People from Pine Island, Minnesota
Military personnel from Minnesota
Winona State University alumni
University of Iowa alumni